The Kiss of Evil is a 2011 Finnish crime film directed by Anders Engström. It is the third installment of the Vares film series and a sequel to previous films Vares: Private Eye (2004) and V2: Dead Angel (2007), but it is the first film to feature Antti Reini as the main character Jussi Vares while in earlier films Vares was played by Juha Veijonen.

Cast
 Antti Reini as Jussi Vares
 Matti Onnismaa as Pastori Alanen
 Eppu Salminen as Juhani Luusalmi
 Jasper Pääkkönen as Kyypakkaus
 Mikko Leppilampi as Ruuhio
 Anu Sinisalo as Laila
 Ville Virtanen as Arto
 Mikko Nousiainen as Lahtipoika
 Maria Järvenhelmi as Anna Huttunen
 Svante Martin as Paavo
 Outi Mäenpää as Asta Malmstén

References

External links
 

2011 films
2011 crime films
2010s Finnish-language films
Finnish crime films